Barry James Robert Prenderville (born 16 October 1976 in Dublin) is an Irish former footballer.

Prenderville was an underage international player for Ireland when he signed for Coventry City from Cherry Orchard as a schoolboy. Having failed to make a first team appearance for Coventry, Prenderville went on loan to Scottish club Hibernian. Prenderville had a successful loan spell with Hibs, but had to return to Coventry in December 1998 after the two clubs failed to agree a fee for a permanent transfer.

Prenderville was eventually released by Coventry in 1999. His form with Hibs earned him a move to Ayr United; this move did not work well, however, and he returned to Ireland with St Patrick's Athletic after making only six appearances for Ayr. Six months later, however, Prenderville returned to English football with Oldham. He was a consistent squad member at Boundary Park, but financial difficulties affected the club in 2002, and Prenderville was one of the players who were offloaded.

Barry once again returned to Dublin in 2002, but this time with Shelbourne. He scored 3 goals in a total of 18 appearances including 2 in the Champions League qualifiers.

When Eamonn Collins became St Pats manager in February 2003, he made Prenderville one of his first signings. His first season back at Richmond Park could be seen as somewhat of a personal success, as he made 39 appearances in all competitions. Prenderville played at right back, centre-half and in midfield.

Prenderville was released by St Pats at the end of the 2005 season, and signed for Shamrock Rovers. He made his debut at Terryland Park in June 2006  but after only 2 league appearances Prenderville was released by the club in July 2006 "due to other commitments", which meant that he was "unable to participate fully with the first team's training schedule".

He played in the 1993 UEFA European Under-16 Football Championship.

Prenderville is currently a Football Association of Ireland facilitator .

References

External links

1976 births
Living people
Association footballers from Dublin (city)
Association football defenders
Republic of Ireland association footballers
Republic of Ireland youth international footballers
Coventry City F.C. players
Hibernian F.C. players
Ayr United F.C. players
St Patrick's Athletic F.C. players
Oldham Athletic A.F.C. players
Shelbourne F.C. players
Shamrock Rovers F.C. players
Scottish Football League players
League of Ireland players
English Football League players
Republic of Ireland expatriate association footballers
Expatriate footballers in England
Expatriate footballers in Scotland
Cherry Orchard F.C. players